Stadio Partenopeo, also known as Stadio Giorgio Ascarelli, was a multi-use stadium in Naples, Italy.  It was used mostly for football matches, and it was also the home ground of S.S.C. Napoli. The stadium was able to hold 40.000 people. During the 1934 World Cup, it hosted two games. The stadium was destroyed by bombardments during the Second World War.

The stadium was named after , an Italian sports executive and businessman in textile industry.

1934 FIFA World Cup
The stadium was used for two matches during the 1934 FIFA World Cup.

Sports venues in Naples
Partenopeo
Defunct football venues in Italy
1934 FIFA World Cup stadiums